The Broken Rosary is a 1934 British musical film directed by Harry Hughes and starring Derek Oldham, Margaret Yarde and Vesta Victoria. It was made at Isleworth Studios.

Cast
 Derek Oldham as Giovanni  
 Jean Adrienne as Maria  
 Vesta Victoria as Vesta  
 Ronald Ward as Jack 
 Marjorie Corbett as Celia  
 Margaret Yarde as Nanny  
 Evelyn Roberts as Uncle Jack  
 Dino Galvani as Carlo  
 Fred Rains as Professor  
 Ian Wilson as Hodge 
 Henry Hepworth as Boy

References

Bibliography
 Low, Rachael. Filmmaking in 1930s Britain. George Allen & Unwin, 1985.
 Wood, Linda. British Films, 1927-1939. British Film Institute, 1986.

External links

1934 films
British musical films
1934 musical films
Films directed by Harry Hughes
Films shot at Isleworth Studios
British black-and-white films
1930s English-language films
1930s British films